Rika (also Romanized as Rīkā) is a village in Hejdandasht Rural District, Salehabad District, Mehran County, Ilam Province, Iran. At the 2006 census, its population was 373, in 79 families. The village is populated by Kurds.

References 

Populated places in Mehran County
Kurdish settlements in Ilam Province